Welcome to Violence is a compilation album by American sludge metal band Buzzov*en, released on April 26, 2005. The album consists of their debut album To a Frown, as well as the EPs Wound and Unwilling to Explain which are all out of print.

Track listing

Personnel
Kirk – vocals, guitar
Igor – bass
Ash – drums
LeDarrell – bass
Little Buddy – guitar
Ash – drums
LeDarrell – bass
Scott – drums
Arik Moonhawk Roper – cover art

References

Buzzoven albums
2005 compilation albums
Alternative Tentacles compilation albums